Guy Bariffi (4 September 1900 – 28 February 1968) was a Swiss racing cyclist. He rode in the 1926 Tour de France.

References

1900 births
1968 deaths
Swiss male cyclists
Place of birth missing